Gavshan Dam is an embankment dam on the Gaveh River  south of Sanandaj in Kordestan province, Iran. It was created for the primary purpose of irrigation but also supports an 11 MW hydroelectric power station. Water from the dam's reservoir is transferred for irrigation in Kordestan and Kermanshah provinces via  Gavshan Water Conveyance Tunnel. Additionally, water from the reservoir is used to provide drinking water for the city of Kermanshah in the amount of  annually. Construction on the dam began in 1992 and was completed in 2004. It was inaugurated by Iran's President Mohammad Khatami on 13 February 2005.

See also

List of power stations in Iran

References

Hydroelectric power stations in Iran
Dams in Kurdistan Province
Rock-filled dams
Dams completed in 2004
Dams in the Tigris River basin
2004 establishments in Iran
Energy infrastructure completed in 2004